The Universytet is a station on Kharkiv Metro's Saltivska Line. The station was opened on 10 August 1984 and is located beneath the Ploscha Svobody, at the time, the largest square in Europe and the second largest in the world after Tiananmen Square, in the centre of Kharkiv.  The station is named after the Kharkiv National University, which is located on top of the square.

Up until 1994 the station was called Dzerzhinska according to the name of the square Poloscha Dzerzhinskoho, (Dzherzhinsky square) after the founder of the Soviet Secret Police Felix Dzerzhinsky.  It currently forms a complex with the adjacent station Derzhprom on the Oleksiivska Line.

The station is located deep underground and is a bi-level pillar-trispan with blank marble columns. The station's service rooms are located on one of the second level balconies, and the other balcony is used as an underground passenger transfer for when there are fairs and concerts on the Ploscha Svobody. The underground transfer was once used for daily passenger usage during the 1980s, but was closed down during the early 1990s.

There are six-meter cupolas in diameter, each hanging 12 meters apart and weighing 120 tons, are incorporated into the ceiling, in which the station's chandeliers hang. The station itself is 13 meters in width, due to the transfer point to the Derzhprom station on the Oleksiyivsky Line. The transfer itself was supposed to include escalator access to passengers, but as there was an economic crisis in the country, the escalators were abandoned and replaced with regular stairs.

A large portrait of Felix Dzerzhinsky was located on the station which was later removed after the renovation of the station. Station vestibules are located on both ends of the station, which have been linked with a network of underground passenger tunnels which have many small shops.

External links
 Gortransport Kharkov - Universitetskaya Station

Kharkiv Metro stations
Railway stations opened in 1984
Railway stations at university and college campuses